TACV Flight 5002 was a flight operated by TACV that crashed on 7 August 1999. Due to technical difficulties, the aircraft normally serving the route from São Pedro Airport on the island of São Vicente, Cape Verde to Agostinho Neto Airport on the island of Santo Antão, a de Havilland Canada DHC-6 Twin Otter, was replaced with a Cape Verde Coast Guard Dornier 228 (registration D4-CBC). 

The aircraft took off from São Pedro at 11:42 for the short flight to Agostinho Neto. Thirteen minutes after takeoff, rain and fog covered Santo Antão and placed the arrival airport below VFR minimums. The pilots made the decision to return to São Vicente at 11:56. The aircraft burst into flames, killing all 18 passengers and crew on board.

References
Aviation Safety

Aviation accidents and incidents in 1999
Airliner accidents and incidents involving controlled flight into terrain
Aviation accidents and incidents in Cape Verde
Accidents and incidents involving the Dornier 228
August 1999 events in Africa
1999 in Cape Verde